The  was an order of the Empire of Japan, established on 12 February 1890 by Emperor Meiji "in commemoration of Jimmu Tennō, the Romulus of Japan". It was officially abolished 1947 by the Supreme Commander for the Allied Powers (SCAP) during the occupation of Japan, after World War II.

Background

The Order of the Golden Kite was an exclusively military award, conferred for bravery, leadership or command in battle. It ranked just below the Order of the Chrysanthemum in precedence and was the military equivalent of the Order of the Paulownia Flowers; therefore, it could be considered analogous to the military division of the Order of the Bath in the United Kingdom. The first three classes were roughly equivalent to the three divisions of the Order of the Bath, the fourth, fifth, sixth and seventh classes were analogous to the DSO, MC/DSC, DCM/CGM and DSM/MM, respectively .

The order consisted of seven classes. Enlisted rank soldiers were eligible for the 7th–5th classes, non-commissioned officers were eligible for the 6th–4th classes, junior officers for the 5th–3rd classes, field grade officers for the 4th–2nd classes and general officers for the 3rd-1st classes.

A total of 1,067,492 Order of the Golden Kite awards were made over the history of the order, most of them in the two lower 6th and 7th classes. Only 41 of the 1st class and 201 of the 2nd class were awarded.

By conflict:
First Sino-Japanese War: about 2000
Russo-Japanese War: about 109,600
World War I: about 3000
Manchurian Incident: about 9000
Second Sino-Japanese War (1937–1941): about 190,000
Pacific War: about 630,000

The award came with an annual monetary stipend, fixed in 1916. This was awarded for the lifetime of the recipient, and following his death, it would be awarded to the recipient's family for one year after. If the recipient died within 5 years of receiving the honor, the stipend would be awarded to the family until the end of the 5-year period.  In 1939, the stipends stood as follows:

1st Class – 1500 yen
2nd Class – 1000 yen
3rd Class – 700 yen
4th Class – 500 yen
5th Class – 350 yen
6th Class – 250 yen
7th Class – 150 yen

Since the monthly pay for a private in the Imperial Japanese Army at the time was 8 yen, 80 sen, this amounted to a very substantial reward. The monetary stipend was abolished in 1940.

The honor was sometimes awarded individually, sometimes awarded en masse. In mid-October 1942, posthumous awards were announced following ceremonies at the Yasukuni Shrine.  Posthumous honorees included 995 who were lost in combat in the far-flung Pacific War battles and 3,031 who were lost fighting in China.  In this instance, Tokyo's official radio broadcast of the list of posthumous recipients of the Order of the Golden Kite was monitored by Allied forces in Asia.   The number of honorees was not considered remarkable at the time, but the number of posthumous awards was considered noteworthy by Allied analysts.  Specific high ranking naval and army officers were named; and in addition, special mention was given to 55 naval aviators and 9 "members of a special attack flotilla"—presumably miniature submarines taking part in the attack on Pearl Harbor.

The order of the Golden Kite was officially abolished by the Supreme Commander of the Allied Powers of Occupied Japan in 1947.

Symbolism

The badge depicts a golden kite, a messenger of the kami as described in the ancient Japanese chronicle Nihon Shoki, which helped Emperor Jimmu defeat his enemies in battle. The golden kite stands on an eight-pointed star with 32 rays enameled in red. Below the kite are two crossed ancient shields, enameled blue, with two crossed spears with silver heads enameled yellow with red banners each bearing a mitsudomoe. On one side is a chokutō (enameled green with white trappings). The reverse side is plain.

The badge was gilt for the 1st-5th classes and silver for the 5th–7th classes. It was suspended on a ribbon in blue-green with a white stripe near the edges, worn as a sash on the left shoulder by the 1st class, as a necklet by the 2nd and 3rd classes, on the left chest by the 4th and 5th classes. The badges for 6th and 7th classes were non-enameled.

The star of the 1st and 2nd classes was similar to the badge as described above, but with both red and yellow enameled rays. It was worn on the left chest by the 1st class, on the right chest by the 2nd class.

Selected recipients

First Class

Imperial Japanese Army
Yamagata Aritomo (1838–1922)
Ōyama Iwao (1842–1916)
Kuroki Tamemoto (1844–1923)
Oku Yasukata (1847–1930)
Nogi Maresuke (1849–1912).
Kawamura Kageaki (1850–1926)
Kodama Gentarō (1852–1906).
Terauchi Masatake (1852–1919)
Nozu Michitsura (1840–1908)
Hasegawa Yoshimichi (1850–1924)
Kamio Mitsuomi (1856–1927)
Okamura Yasuji (1884–1966)
Honjō Shigeru (1876–1945)
Mutō Nobuyoshi (1868–1933)
Hata Shunroku (1879–1962)
Terauchi Hisaichi (1879–1946)
Prince Asaka Yasuhiko (1887–1981)
Matsui Iwane (1878–1948)
Sugiyama Hajime (1880–1945)
Nishio Toshizō (1881–1960)
Yamashita Tomoyuki (1885–1946)

Imperial Japanese Navy
Tōgō Heihachirō (1848–1934)
Yamamoto Gonnohyōe (1852–1933)
Ijuin Gorō (1852–1921)
Itō Sukeyuki (1843–1914)
Kamimura Hikonojō (1849–1916)
Kataoka Shichirō (1854–1920)
Suzuki Kantarō (1868–1948)
Yonai Mitsumasa (1880–1948)
Yamamoto Isoroku (1884–1943)
Nagumo Chūichi (1887–1944)
Koga Mineichi (1885–1944)
Arima Masafumi (1895–1944)
Oikawa Koshirō (1883–1958)
Hasegawa Kiyoshi (1883–1970)
Yamaguchi Tamon (1892–1942)

Second Class

Imperial Japanese Army
Prince Komatsu Akihito (1846–1903) 
Prince Fushimi Sadanaru (1858–1923) 
Yamaguchi Motomi (1846–1904)
Kawakami Soroku (1848–1899)
Ōshima Yoshimasa (1850–1926) 
Fukushima Yasumasa (1852–1919)
Umezawa Michiharu (1853–1924).
Ishimoto Shinroku (1854–1912)
Uehara Yūsaku (1856–1933)
Nagaoka Gaishi (1858–1933)
Akiyama Yoshifuru (1859–1930)
Yamanashi Hanzō (1864–1944)
Shirakawa Yoshinori (1869–1932)
Araki Sadao (1877–1966)
Tada Hayao (1882–1948)
Tojo Hideki (1884–1948)
Ushiroku Jun (1884–1973)
Katō Tateo (1903–1942).

Imperial Japanese Navy
Kabayama Sukenori (1837–1922)
Saigō Jūdō (1843–1902)
Inoue Yoshika (1845–1929)
Hidaka Sōnojō (1848–1932)
Saito Makoto (1858–1936)
Katō Tomosaburō (1861–1923) 
Shimada Shigetarō (1883–1976)
Takagi Takeo (1892–1944).

Third Class

Imperial Japanese Army
Emperor Taishō (1879–1926)
Prince Chichibu (1902–1953)
Prince Kitashirakawa Yoshihisa (1847–1895)
Katsura Taro (1848–1913)
Tanaka Giichi (1864–1929)
Yamaji Motoharu (1841–1897)
Andō Sadayoshi (1853–1932)
Kusunose Yukihiko (1858–1927)
Ōshima Ken'ichi (1858–1947)
Akashi Motojiro (1864–1919)
Ueda Kenkichi (1875–1962)
Mori Ōgai (1862–1922)
Ishiwara Kanji (1889–1949)
Tanaka Ryūkichi (1893–1972)

Imperial Japanese Navy
Prince Arisugawa Takehito (1862–1913)
Prince Higashifushimi Yorihito (1867–1922)
Okada Keisuke (1868–1952)
Tsuboi Kōzō (1843–1898)
Taketomi Kunikane (1852–1931)
Yashiro Rokurō (1860–1930)
Yamashita Gentarō (1863–1931)
Satō Tetsutarō (1866–1942)
Takarabe Takeshi (1867–1949)
Eto Kyōsuke (1881–1917)

Fourth Class

Imperial Japanese Army
Prince Takamatsu (1905–1987)
Prince Nashimoto Morimasa (1874–1951)
Ugaki Kazushige (1868–1956)
Minami Jirō (1874–1955)
Hayashi Senjūrō (1876–1943)
Masaki Jinzaburō (1876–1956)
Koiso Kuniaki (1880–1950)
Ishii Shirō (1892–1959).

Imperial Japanese Navy
Ogasawara Naganari (1867–1958)
Abo Kiyokazu (1870–1948)
Hyakutake Saburō (1872–1963)

Fifth Class

Imperial Japanese Army
 Prince Takeda Tsunehisa (1883–1919)
 Hishikari Takashi (1871–1952)
 Katsuki Kiyoshi (1881–1950)
 Ōba Sakae (1914–1992)
 Tsuji Masanobu (1902–1961).

Imperial Japanese Navy
 Kobayashi Seizō (1877–1962)
 Matsudaira Morio (1878–1944)
 Nishida Yoshimi (1892–1944)
 Iwamoto Tetsuzō (1916–1955)

Sixth Class

Seventh Class

See also
 Kite (bird)—raptor referenced in Imperial war decoration

Notes

References
 Chamberlain, Basil Hall. (1905)   Things Japanese: Being Notes on Various Subjects Connected with Japan for the Use of Travelers and Others, London: John Murray.
 Iwata Nishizawa. (1917). Japan in the Taisho era. In Commemoration of the Enthronement.  Tokyo: __. OCLC 28706155
 Keene, Donald. (1998). "The Sino-Japanese War of 1894–95 and its Cultural Effects in Japan", in  Meiji Japan, Peter F. Kornicki, editor. London: Routledge.  (paper)  .
 Peterson, James W., Barry C. Weaver and Michael A. Quigley. (2001). Orders and Medals of Japan and Associated States. San Ramon, California: Orders and Medals Society of America. 
 Tsuji, Masanobu. (1997). Japan's Greatest Victory, Britain's Worst Defeat, Margaret E. Lake, tr. New York: Da Capo Press.  (cloth)

External links

 Japan, Cabinet Office: Decorations and Medals—Order of the Golden Kite unmentioned in current system of honors
 Japan Mint: Production Process
 Imperial Japanese Navy Awards of the Golden Kite in World War II

Military awards and decorations of Japan
Military of the Empire of Japan
1890 establishments in Japan
1947 disestablishments in Japan
Awards established in 1890